Scottown is an unincorporated community in eastern Windsor Township, Lawrence County, Ohio, United States.  It has a post office with the ZIP code 45678.

References

Unincorporated communities in Lawrence County, Ohio

Unincorporated communities in Ohio